TREMEC (Transmisiones y Equipos Mecánicos SA de CV, formerly Transmission Technology Corporation, TTC) is a manufacturer of automobile transmissions and drivetrain components based in Querétaro, Mexico.

Company
Torque transfer solutions from TREMEC are found in products ranging from supercars and high-performance sports cars to severe duty, vocational and commercial vehicles worldwide. The portfolio of products includes manual transmissions, dual-clutch transmissions, hybrid and electric vehicle (EV) solutions, gears, driveshafts, clutches, mechatronic systems, transmission control units, and control software.

The company has its US operations based in Novi, Michigan. This deals with sales, marketing and engineering office (and was, until 2018, based in Wixom, Michigan). Production facilities are located in Pedro Escobedo and Santiago de Querétaro, in Mexico, and Zedelgem (Bruges area) in Belgium. TREMEC is a wholly owned subsidiary of KUO Group, which is based in Mexico City.

Some of the first TREMEC products were originally designed by Borg-Warner, including the widely used T-56.

History
TREMEC was founded on April 12, 1964. The genesis was to manufacture transmissions in Mexico for Ford, GM and Chrysler. At that time, the Mexican government enacted a protectionist policy that mandated all vehicles assembled in Mexico have engines and transmissions 100-percent manufactured in Mexico. A joint venture was formed which included one of Ford's large transmissions suppliers – Clark Transmissions – and two entrepreneurial companies based in Mexico. TREMEC's first transmissions would be produced later that same year.

Products

 Aftermarket transmissions
 Tremec T-5 transmission
 Tremec T-45 transmission
 Tremec TKO transmission
 Tremec T-56 transmission
 TREMEC Magnum 6-speed transmission
 TREMEC Magnum XL 6-speed transmission
 OEM transmissions
 Tremec TR-2450 transmission
 Tremec TR-3160 transmission
 Tremec TR-3450 transmission
 Tremec TR-3650 transmission
 TR-3655 transmission
 Tremec TR-4050 transmission
 Tremec TR-6060 transmission
 Tremec TR-6070 transmission
 Tremec TR-9070 DCT 7-speed dual clutch transmission
 Tremec TR-9080 DCT 8-speed dual clutch transmission
 Medium & Heavy Duty Truck Transmissions
 EASY-SHIFT 5-speed
 EASY-SHIFT 7-speed
 PRO-SHIFT 6-Speed
 PRO-SHIFT 7-Speed
 PRO-SHIFT 9-Speed
 PRO-SHIFT 10-Speed
 PRO-SHIFT 18-Speed

References

External links 
 Transmission Technologies corporation website
 

Automotive companies of Belgium
Auto parts suppliers of the United States
Auto parts suppliers of Mexico
Manufacturing companies based in Michigan

Automotive transmission makers